Dell sells LCD-based computer monitors.  Dell bundles monitors with its desktop computers as package deals, as well as selling them separately through their online store and some other retailers.

CRT monitors

Dell no longer sells CRT monitors as the technology has been rendered obsolete by the widespread adoption of LCD monitors.

LCD monitors

The current base of models naming:
 "P" is "Professional".
 "U" line is a "UltraSharp"
 "UP" means UltraSharp with PremierColor, with factory calibration and wider color gamut. 
 "S" and "E" are a low-end, gaming and consumer displays.

The second set of numbers is the screen size in inches, often followed by the model year and a suffix, eg "FP" for "flat panel", "W" for "wide-screen"

Basic specifications:

Detailed specifications:

UltraSharp LCD monitors

"UltraSharp" is a hi-end line of Dell monitors equipped with basic professional features (such as factory calibration, brightness/color uniformity compensation, and others).

The model names of "UltraSharp" monitors contain a "U" prefix for current products.

Basic specifications:

Detailed specifications:

Professional series LCD monitors

Basic specifications:

See also
Lenovo ThinkVision monitors
EIZO ColorEdge displays

References

External links

Dell Widescreen and Flat Panel Monitors
Identifying Dell Monitor types by their Model Number

Monitors
Computer monitors